Gawler Central railway station is the terminus station of the Gawler line.

History
The station opened in May 1911 as Willaston, being renamed North Gawler in September 1911, and Gawler Central on 12 February 1984. In the early 1920s the South Australian Railways decided to extend suburban service to all stations within a  radius of Adelaide station. North Gawler, which is located 26 miles 14 chains from Adelaide, was not included. From May 1911 until the 19th of June 1989 Willaston, Gawler North and eventually Gawler Central station had a station manager or staff member on site to sell tickets to passengers on the rail network. 

Gawler Central is now the terminus of the line. It had previously continued as the Barossa Valley line. The last services on it were operated by Genesee & Wyoming Australia providing a daily Penrice Stone Train. This service ceased in June 2014; a rail trail has been planned.

Services by platform

References

External links

Railway stations in Adelaide
Railway stations in Australia opened in 1911